Lumo may refer to:
Lumo (film), a 2007 documentary film
Lumo (train operating company), a UK open access train operator
Lumo (video game), a 2016 action-adventure game
Lumo Energy, an Australian energy brand 
LUMO, in chemistry, lowest unoccupied molecular orbital
 Nickname of physics blogger Luboš Motl